Stenoptilodes agricultura is a moth of the family Pterophoridae that is known from Venezuela.

Adults are on wing in October.

Etymology
The name "Rancho Grande" means, large cattle farm. This locality has provided many interesting plume moth species.

External links

agricultura
Moths described in 2006
Endemic fauna of Venezuela
Moths of South America
Taxa named by Cees Gielis